Malta participated in the Eurovision Song Contest 2014 with the song "Coming Home" written by Richard Micallef. The song was performed by Firelight. The Maltese entry for the 2014 contest in Copenhagen, Denmark was selected through the national final Malta Eurovision Song Contest 2014, organised by the Maltese broadcaster Public Broadcasting Services (PBS). The competition consisted of a semi-final round and a final, held on 7 and 8 February 2014, respectively, where "Coming Home" performed by Firelight eventually emerged as the winning entry after scoring the most points from a five-member jury and a public televote.

Malta was drawn to compete in the second semi-final of the Eurovision Song Contest which took place on 8 May 2014. Performing as the opening entry during the show in position 1, "Coming Home" was announced among the top 10 entries of the second semi-final and therefore qualified to compete in the final on 10 May. It was later revealed that Malta placed ninth out of the 15 participating countries in the semi-final with 64 points. In the final, Malta performed in position 22 and placed twenty-third out of the 26 participating countries, scoring 32 points.

Background 

Prior to the 2014 contest, Malta had participated in the Eurovision Song Contest twenty-six times since its first entry in 1971. Malta briefly competed in the Eurovision Song Contest in the 1970s before withdrawing for sixteen years. The country had, to this point, competed in every contest since returning in 1991. Malta's best placing in the contest thus far was second, which it achieved on two occasions: in 2002 with the song "7th Wonder" performed by Ira Losco and in the 2005 contest with the song "Angel" performed by Chiara. In the 2013 edition, Malta qualified to the final and placed 8th with the song "Tomorrow" performed by Gianluca.

For the 2014 contest, the Maltese national broadcaster, Public Broadcasting Services (PBS), broadcast the event within Malta and organised the selection process for the nation's entry. PBS confirmed their intentions to participate at it on 19 July 2013. Malta selected their entry consistently through a national final procedure, a method that was continued for their 2014 participation.

Before Eurovision

Malta Eurovision Song Contest 2014 
Malta Eurovision Song Contest 2014 was the national final format developed by PBS to select the Maltese entry for the Eurovision Song Contest 2014. The competition consisted of a semi-final and final held on 7 and 8 February 2014, respectively, at the Malta Fairs and Conventions Centre in Ta' Qali. Both shows were hosted by television presenter Moira Delia and past Maltese Eurovision entrants Ira Losco and Gianluca Bezzina and broadcast on Television Malta (TVM) as well on the broadcaster's website tvm.com.mt, while the final was also broadcast on the official Eurovision Song Contest website eurovision.tv.

Format
The competition consisted of twenty songs competing in the semi-final on 7 February 2014 where the top fourteen entries qualified to compete in the final on 8 February 2014. Five judges evaluated the songs during the shows and each judge had an equal stake in the final result. The sixth set of votes were the results of the public televote, which had a weighting equal to the votes of a single judge. Ties in the final results were broken based on the entry which received the higher score from the judges.

Competing entries
Artists and composers were able to submit their entries between 24 September 2013 and 31 October 2013 with an entry fee of €150 per submission. Songwriters from any nationality were able to submit songs as long as the artist were Maltese or possessed Maltese citizenship. Artists were able to submit as many songs as they wished, however, they could only compete with a maximum of two in the semi-final and one in the final. 2013 national final winner Gianluca Bezzina was unable to compete due to a rule that prevented the previous winner from competing in the following competition. 210 entries were received by the broadcaster. On 19 November 2013, PBS announced a shortlist of 70 entries that had progressed through the selection process. The twenty songs selected to compete in the semi-final were announced on the TVM programme Xarabank on 29 November 2013. In order to present the competing songs to the public, the semi-finalists filmed promotional videos for their entries which were released in December 2013.

Among the selected competing artists were former Maltese Eurovision entrants Miriam Christine who represented Malta in the 1996 contest and Fabrizio Faniello who represented Malta in the 2001 and 2006 contests. Sophie DeBattista represented Malta in the Junior Eurovision Song Contest 2006 and Daniel Testa represented Malta in the Junior Eurovision Song Contest 2008. Among the songwriters, Boris Cezek, Paul Abela, Gerard James Borg and Philip Vella were all past writers of Maltese Eurovision entries. Paul Giordimaina represented Malta in the 1991 edition and together with Fleur Balzan co-wrote the Maltese entry in 2011; Stephen Rudden represented the United Kingdom in the 1995 edition as part of the group Love City Groove; Glen Vella represented Malta in the 2011 edition; Johan Bejerholm co-wrote the Azerbaijani entry in 2009.

Semi-final 
The semi-final took place on 7 February 2014. Twenty songs competed for fourteen qualifying spots in the final. The running order for the semi-final was announced on 3 December 2013. The interval act featured guest performances by Denmark's Eurovision Song Contest 2013 winner Emmelie de Forest performing "Only Teardrops", 2014 Ukrainian Eurovision entrant Maria Yaremchuk performing "Tick-Tock" and the local bands the Crowns and Red Electrick.

The five members of the jury that evaluated the entries during the semi-final consisted of:

Reuben Zammit (Malta) – Head of Programmes at PBS
Ekaterina Orlova (Russia) – Head of Delegation for Russia at the Eurovision Song Contest
Alessandro Capicchioni (San Marino) – Head of Delegation for San Marino at the Eurovision Song Contest
Victoria Romanova (Ukraine) – Head of Delegation for Ukraine at the Eurovision Song Contest
Arthur Caruana (Malta) – Disc jockey

Final
The final took place on 8 February 2014. The fourteen entries that qualified from the semi-final were performed again and the votes of a five-member jury panel (5/6) and the results of public televoting (1/6) determined the winner. The interval act featured guest performances by Malta's Junior Eurovision Song Contest 2013 winner Gaia Cauchi, Emmelie de Forest performing "Rainmaker", 2014 Swiss Eurovision entrant Sebalter performing "Hunter of Stars" and the local bands Winter Moods and Ġorġ u Pawlu. After the votes from the jury panel and televote were combined, "Coming Home" performed by Firelight were the winners.

The five members of the jury that evaluated the entries during the final consisted of:

Peter Cossai (Malta) – Head of Sports at PBS
Ekaterina Orlova (Russia) – Head of Delegation for Russia at the Eurovision Song Contest
Nicola Caligiore (Italy) – Head of Delegation for Italy at the Eurovision Song Contest
Olga Salamakha (Belarus) – Head of Delegation for Belarus at the Eurovision Song Contest
Reuben Zammitt (Malta) – Head of Programmes at PBS

At Eurovision 

During the semi-final allocation draw on 20 January 2014 at the Copenhagen City Hall, Malta was drawn to compete in the first half of the second semi-final on 8 May 2014. In the second semi-final, the producers of the show decided that Malta would open the semi-final and perform 1st, preceding Israel. Malta qualified from the second semi-final, placing 9th with 63 points and competed in the final on 10 May 2014. During the winner's press conference for the second semi-final qualifiers, Malta was allocated to compete in the second half of the final. In the final, the producers of the show decided that Malta would perform 22nd, following Hungary and preceding Denmark. Malta finished with an overall score of 32 points landing 23rd place.

The Maltese performance featured Firelight performing with instruments on stage. The LED screens transitioned from red and blue skies with black and white photos displayed on the cube screens. The black and white photos were 208 selfies that the Maltese broadcaster received after a public request was made asking fans to send in their photos in late March 2014.

In Malta, the semi-finals and the finals were broadcast on TVM with commentary by Carlo Borg Bonaci. The Maltese spokesperson revealing the result of the Maltese vote in the final was Valentina Rossi.

Voting

Points awarded to Malta

Points awarded by Malta

Detailed voting results
The following members comprised the Maltese jury:
 Paul Abela (jury chairperson)musician, composer, maestro
 Manolito Galeasound engineer
 Elton Zarbmusic producer
 Corazon Mizzitelevision host, semi-professional singer/songwriter
 Pamela Bezzinavocal coach, singer, vocal arranger

References

2014
Countries in the Eurovision Song Contest 2014
Eurovision
Articles containing video clips